Mary Monck (1677?1715) was a celebrated beauty and poet.

Life
She was the second daughter of Robert Molesworth, 1st Viscount Molesworth, and Letitia Coote, third daughter of Richard, Lord Coloony, and sister of Richard, Earl of Bellamont.

She became the first wife of George Monck of St Stephen's Green, Dublin, and died at Bath in 1715. They had two daughters (the eldest, Sarah Monck, died in 1739) and one son, Henry Stanley Monck of St Stephen's Green, who died in 1745.

Works
By her own application she acquired a knowledge of the Latin, Italian, and Spanish languages, and read much English literature. Some poems by her appeared shortly after her death under the title of Marinda. Poems and Translations upon several occasions, London, 1716, 8vo. 
 
On her deathbed she wrote some very affecting verses to her husband, which are not included in her works, but which were printed in Barber's collection Poems by Eminent Ladies.

References

External links
 Mary Monck at the Eighteenth-Century Poetry Archive (ECPA)

Attribution

Year of birth unknown
Year of birth uncertain
1715 deaths
17th-century Irish poets
17th-century Irish women writers
18th-century Irish poets
18th-century Irish women writers
Daughters of viscounts
Irish women poets
People from County Dublin